Darwin Sound is a sound in the Queen Charlotte Islands of British Columbia, Canada.  It is located between Moresby Island (W) and Lyell Island (E) and was named in 1878 by Canada's then-Chief Geographer George M. Dawson in honour of Charles Darwin, the eminent naturalist.

References

Landforms of Haida Gwaii
Sounds of British Columbia